The 1883 Ohio gubernatorial election was held on October 9, 1883. Democratic nominee George Hoadly defeated Republican nominee Joseph B. Foraker with 49.87% of the vote.

General election

Candidates
Major party candidates
George Hoadly, Democratic
Joseph B. Foraker, Republican 

Other candidates
Ferdinand Schumacher, Prohibition
Charles Jenkins, Greenback

Results

References

1883
Ohio
1883 Ohio elections